Diomedeoides is a prehistoric genus of seabirds. The family was in the order Procellariiformes which today is composed of the albatrosses and petrels. At present it is the only genus in the family Diomedeoididae. There are three described species. The taxonomy of the family and genus is still in need to revision, and it is likely that the genus name Diomedeoides is actually the junior synonym to Rupelornis (van Beneden, 1871).

Fossils of this genus have been found in the Oligocene and Miocene rocks in Europe and Iran. Two species, D. brodkorbi and D. lipsiensis are known from Central Europe, the third species D. babaheydariensis known only from Iran.

References

Oligocene birds
Miocene birds
Procellariiformes
Fossil taxa described in 1985